Julian Lüftner (born 11 January 1993) is an Austrian snowboarder who competed at the 2022 Winter Olympics.

Career
He represented Austria at the 2022 Winter Olympics in the snowboard cross event.

References

1993 births
Living people
Austrian male snowboarders
Olympic snowboarders of Austria
Snowboarders at the 2022 Winter Olympics
People from Zams
Sportspeople from Tyrol (state)